The FIBA Africa Championship 1983 was hosted by Egypt from December 19 to December 28, 1983.  The games were played in Alexandria.  Egypt won the tournament, its fifth African Championship, to qualify for the 1984 Summer Olympics in Los Angeles.

Competing Nations
The following national teams competed:

Preliminary rounds

Group A

Day 1

Day 2

Day 3

Day 4

Day 5

Group B

Day 1

Day 2

Day 3

Day 4

Day 5

Knockout stage

Classification Stage

Final standings

Egypt qualified for the 1984 Summer Olympics.

External links
 FIBA Archive

B
1983 in African basketball
AfroBasket
December 1983 sports events in Africa
International basketball competitions hosted by Egypt